The following highways are numbered 348:

Australia

Canada
Manitoba Provincial Road 348
 Nova Scotia Route 348
Prince Edward Island Route 348
 Quebec Route 348

India
 National Highway 348 (India)

Japan
 Japan National Route 348

United States
  Arkansas Highway 348
  Colorado State Highway 348
  Georgia State Route 348
  Kentucky Route 348
  Louisiana Highway 348
  Maryland Route 348
 New York:
  New York State Route 348 (former)
  County Route 348 (Erie County, New York)
  Ohio State Route 348
  Pennsylvania Route 348
  Puerto Rico Highway 348
  Tennessee State Route 348
 Texas:
  Texas State Highway 348 (former)
  Texas State Highway Spur 348
  Virginia State Route 348